The Truscott/USPC Senior Swiss Teams North American bridge championship is held at the summer American Contract Bridge League (ACBL) North American Bridge Championship (NABC).

The Truscott/USPC Senior Swiss Teams is a four session Swiss teams, two qualifying sessions and two final sessions.
The event typically starts on the first Monday of the NABC.
The event is open to players 55 or older.

History
The Truscott/USPC Senior Swiss Teams is an event for four to six players in which participants must be 55 or older to compete. There is a one-day (two sessions) qualifying and a second day (also two sessions) final. Scoring is by International Match Points (IMPs) converted to Victory Points. Scores from the two qualifying sessions are converted to a carryover and added to the teams' total in the final two sessions.

The trophy for the contest, named in memory of ACBL Hall of Fame member and former bridge editor of The New York Times Alan Truscott, was put into play in 2006 by the United States Playing Card Company.

Winners

Sources

List of previous winners, Page 8

2008 winners, Page 1

External links
ACBL official website

North American Bridge Championships